Alonina is a genus of moths in the family Sesiidae.

Species
Alonina difformis  Hampson, 1919
Alonina longipes (Holland, 1893)
Alonina rygchiiformis  Walker, 1856

References

Sesiidae